Hassan Dars was a poet of the Sindhi language’s modern generation. He was born on 5 September 1966 in Village Hoothee Mashaekh, Tando Allahyar District, Sindh. He died in road accident on 16 June 2011.

Background
His birth name was Muhummad Hassan. His father’s name was Meenhoon Ghullam Rasool Dars, who had given him complete freedom of life and responsibilities in his life,and he also was a very close and relative of Rasool Bux Dars who was a friend ,relative and their mantlity was also same .They share their thought at the night and having gossips they mostly meat at Jhimpir and sharing each other everything.

Education
Hassan got his primary education in his native village Hoothee Mashaekh, and for higher education he moved to Hyderabad where he got admission in Muslim College Hyderabad and after intermediate course he obtained master degree from University of Sindh, Jamshoro, Sindh.

Professional career
Hassan had versatile talents, he was one of the founder team member of Sindh TV, where he produced, directed and written various programs. He worked in different jobs and lastly he was associated with United Nations Development Programme - GEF Small Grants Project on old local thoroughbred of Sindhi-Lukhi horse. Under this project he produced a documentary and a book about this thoroughbred of horse. He also made regular appearances on Sindhi television channels and did radio programmes also. In 1985, he joined as an editor of the Sindhi daily newspaper, ‘Sawal’, for five years.

Literary career
Hassan Dars was used to write blank verses and Ghazals in the Sindhi language for years, but his peak of creativity turned him as modern Sindh's famous poet in late 90. As Shaikh Ayaz, a great poet of Sindh had once expressed about Hassan that: “Hassan is a leading poet of future generations of Sindh.”  Hassan composed thousands of poems but they were never published in book form. His poems appeared, however, in newspapers and magazines or were heard by fans over the television and radio. He was an expert with metaphors and his genre was mostly romantic poetry, so much so that he was regarded as ‘the poet of young hearts’ by the late Shaikh Ayaz, a 20th-century Sindhi poet. His fans called him “the best poet after Shaikh Ayaz”. In short time Hassan made his own space in Sindhi people with his poetry on nature, romance and revolutionary human behaviors. Most of the readers were calling him as 'Poet of Nature'.

Publications
Hassan wrote several articles, poetry in local Sindhi newspapers, [magazines and tabloid, but his first book named: "Hassan Dars jo Risalo" a collection of his poetry was launched, more than a year after his death. It is the first publication of his works in the fourth Karachi Literature Festival.

Death
Hassan Dars died on 16 June 2011, after suffering serious wounds in a road accident in the wee hours. He was later on buried in his native village Hoothee Mashaekh.

References

Pakistani poets
Sindhi-language poets
Sindhi people
1968 births
2011 deaths